Anna is a live-action short film directed by London-based Israeli filmmaker Dekel Berenson. This 15 minute film addresses real-world social and humanitarian issues by depicting the "Love Tours" organised in Ukraine for foreign men who are searching for a female partner to take home. Anna premiered in competition at the 72nd Cannes Film Festival, won a BIFA, was shortlisted for a BAFTA and was nominated for both the Israeli Film Academy Awards and Ukrainian Film Academy Awards.

Plot 
Anna, a middle-aged single mother living in war-torn Eastern Ukraine, is desperate for a change. While at work in a meat processing plant, she hears a radio advertisement to attend a party organised for foreign men who are touring the country, searching for love. Once there along with her daughter, Anna faces the realities of old age and understands men's real intentions. They both become aware of the absurdity and indignity of the situation.

Cast 

 Svetlana Alekseevna Barandich as Anna
 Anastasia Vyazovskaya as Alina
 Alina Chornogub as the translator
 Liana Khobelia as the party organiser

Reception
The film has received numerous awards, and screened at about 350 festivals and selected more than 160 times.

References

External links 
 Anna on the director’s website
 

2019 films
2019 short films
British short films
Ukrainian short films
2010s English-language films
Israeli short films